The St. Louis Cardinals 1994 season was the team's 113th season in St. Louis, Missouri and the 103rd season in the National League.  The Cardinals went 53-61 during the season and finished tied for 3rd place with the Pittsburgh Pirates in the National League Central division, 13 games behind the Cincinnati Reds. The season was cut short due to the infamous 1994 player's strike.

Catcher Tom Pagnozzi won a Gold Glove this year.

Offseason
October 27, 1993: Terry McGriff was signed as a free agent with the St. Louis Cardinals.
November 15, 1993: Scott Coolbaugh was signed as a free agent with the St. Louis Cardinals.
December 14, 1993: Ozzie Canseco was traded by the St. Louis Cardinals to the Milwaukee Brewers for Tony Diggs (minors).

Regular season

By Friday, August 12, the Cardinals had compiled a 53-61 record through 114 games (although they had actually played 115 games, since their April 6 match versus the Cincinnati Reds at Riverfront Stadium ended after the top of the 6th inning due to poor weather). They had scored 535 runs (4.65 per game) and allowed 621 runs (5.40 per game).

Opening Day starters
Luis Alicea
René Arocha
Bernard Gilkey
Gregg Jefferies
Ray Lankford
Erik Pappas
Ozzie Smith
Mark Whiten
Todd Zeile

Season standings

Record vs. opponents

Transactions
June 2, 1994: Ryan Freel was drafted by the St. Louis Cardinals in the 14th round of the 1994 amateur draft, but did not sign.

Roster

Player stats

Batting

Starters by position 
Note: Pos = Position; G = Games played; AB = At bats; H = Hits; Avg. = Batting average; HR = Home runs; RBI = Runs batted in

Other batters 
Note: G = Games played; AB = At bats; H = Hits; Avg. = Batting average; HR = Home runs; RBI = Runs batted in

Pitching

Starting pitchers 
Note: G = Games pitched; IP = Innings pitched; W = Wins; L = Losses; ERA = Earned run average; SO = Strikeouts

Other pitchers 
Note: G = Games pitched; IP = Innings pitched; W = Wins; L = Losses; ERA = Earned run average; SO = Strikeouts

Relief pitchers 
Note: G = Games pitched; W = Wins; L = Losses; SV = Saves; ERA = Earned run average; SO = Strikeouts

Farm system 

LEAGUE CHAMPIONS: Savannah, New Jersey, AZL Cardinals

References

External links
1994 St. Louis Cardinals at Baseball Reference
1994 St. Louis Cardinals team page at www.baseball-almanac.com

St. Louis Cardinals seasons
St Lou